The Gloucestershire Fire and Rescue Service is the statutory emergency fire and rescue service for the non-metropolitan county of Gloucestershire, England. The service is run by Gloucestershire County Council. The service does not cover the unitary authority of South Gloucestershire which is covered by Avon Fire and Rescue Service.

The service's headquarters are located at the TriService Emergency Centre in Quedgeley, near Gloucester. Also operating from there are Gloucestershire Constabulary and South Western Ambulance Service.

An inspectors report in 2019 rated the service as "inadequate" and had "a culture of bullying and harassment.".

Performance
In 2018/2019, every fire and rescue service in England and Wales was subjected to a statutory inspection by Her Majesty's Inspectorate of Constabulary and Fire & Rescue Services (HIMCFRS). The inspection investigated how well the service performs in each of three areas. On a scale of outstanding, good, requires improvement and inadequate, Gloucestershire Fire and Rescue Service was rated as follows:

Fire stations

The service has 21 fire stations, 16 of which are crewed by retained firefighters; and five which are either wholetime, or a mix of wholetime and retained.

Wholetime fire stations:

Wholetime and retained fire stations:

Retained fire stations:

Tewkesbury fire station is also home to Severn Area Rescue Association, which has based one of its five River Severn rescue stations there.

Co-responder stations
Gloucestershire Fire and Rescue Service works in partnership with the South West Ambulance Service to provide emergency medical cover to select areas of Gloucestershire. Lydney, Coleford, Newent, Wotton-Under-Edge, Dursley, Chipping Camden, and Tetbury have been identified as having the greatest need for ambulance cover. The aim of a fire service co-responder team is to preserve life until the arrival of either a Rapid Response Vehicle (RRV) or an Ambulance. Co-responder vehicles are equipped with:
 Defibrillator
 Bag and mask resuscitator
 Oxygen
 Airway suction units
 Standard first aid equipment

See also
Fire service in the United Kingdom
List of British firefighters killed in the line of duty

References

External links

 
Gloucestershire Fire and Rescue Service at HMICFRS

Fire and rescue services of England
Fire